Nikolai Leonidovich Tsvetkov (born 1 March 1964) is a former Russian football player.

Club career
He made his Russian Premier League debut for FC Uralmash Yekaterinburg on 2 August 1992 in a game against FC Dynamo Stavropol. That was his only season in the top tier.

References

1964 births
People from Nizhny Tagil
Living people
Soviet footballers
Russian footballers
Association football defenders
FC Uralets Nizhny Tagil players
FC Neftyanik Ufa players
FC Ural Yekaterinburg players
Russian Premier League players
Sportspeople from Sverdlovsk Oblast